The 2018 World Allround Speed Skating Championships were held at the Olympic Stadium in Amsterdam, Netherlands, from 9 to 11 March 2018.

Schedule
All times are local (UTC+1).

Medal summary

Medal table

Medalists

References

External links
Official website
ISU website

 
World Allround Speed Skating Championships
World Allround Speed Skating Championships
2018 Allround
World Allround Speed Skating Championships
World Allround
World Allround Speed Skating Championships, 2018